Berchakovo is a rural locality (a village) in Klyazminskoye Rural Settlement, Kovrovsky District, Vladimir Oblast, Russia.

Geography 
Berchakovo is located 23 km northeast of Kovrov (the district's administrative centre) by road. Repniki is the nearest rural locality.

References 

Rural localities in Kovrovsky District